Rain Forest is a 1966 album by Walter Wanderley.

Reception 

Billboard magazine reviewed the album in their September 3, 1966 issue and wrote that the "young Brazilian organist plays superbly" and that ""Summer Samba" has the power to pull this delightful package right up the LP chart".

Judith Schlesinger reviewed the reissue of the album for Allmusic and wrote that the album "does evoke strong water images, like "poolside" and "ice skating rink."" and that the listener is "catapulted straight back to the '60s when bossa nova was new in the U.S. and everyone wanted a piece of it". Schlesinger commented that the shortness of the songs left the "jazzmen...underutilized", but praised Urbie Green's work on "Rain" and "Beach Samba".

Track listing 
 "Summer Samba (So Nice)" (Norman Gimbel, Marcos Valle, Paulo Sérgio Valle) – 3:07
 "It's Easy to Say Good-Bye" (Tito Madi) – 2:03
 "Cried, Cried" (Luiz Antonio) – 2:26
 "Rain" (Durval Ferreira) – 3:48
 "The Girl from Ipanema" (Norman Gimbel, Antônio Carlos Jobim, Vinícius de Moraes) – 2:38
 "Beloved Melancholy" (Madi) – 2:42
 "Taste of Sadness" (Luiz Antonio, Ferreira) – 2:54
 "Bossa Na Praia (Beach Samba)" (Geraldo Cunha, Pery Ribeiro) – 3:54
 "Call Me" (Tony Hatch) – 2:26
 "Cry out Your Sadness" (Oscar Castro-Neves) – 2:46
 "The Great Love" (Jobim) – 3:04
 "Samba do Avião (Song of the Jet)" (Jobim, Gene Lees) – 2:43

Personnel 
Walter Wanderley – arranger, electronic organ, piano
Claudio Slon – drums
Jose Marino – bass
Joe Grimm – flute
Bucky Pizzarelli – guitar
Urbie Green – trombone
Bobby Rosengarden – percussion

Production
Creed Taylor – producer
Tony Bennett – liner notes
Deborah Hay – editing, text editor
Sung Lee – art direction, design
Acy Lehman – cover design
Suzanne White – design coordinator
Val Valentin – engineer, director of engineering
Rudy Van Gelder – engineer
Richard Seidel – executive producer
Kevin Reeves – mastering
Smay Vision – package layout
Tom Greenwood, Carlos Kase, Bryan Koniarz – production coordination
Ben Young – reissue research, restoration
Jerry Rappaport – reissue supervisor

References 

1966 albums
Albums produced by Creed Taylor
Albums recorded at Van Gelder Studio
Walter Wanderley albums
Verve Records albums